With the adoption of letters from the International Phonetic Alphabet (IPA) in various national alphabets, letter case forms have been developed. This usually means capital (uppercase) forms were developed, but in the case of the glottal stop , both uppercase  and lowercase  are used.

The adoption of IPA letters has been particularly notable in Sub-Saharan Africa, in languages such as Hausa, Fula, Akan, Gbe languages, Manding languages, and Lingala. The most common are open o , open e , and eng , but several others are found. Kabiyé of northern Togo, for example, has  (or ), as in this newspaper headline:
 MBƱ AJƐYA KIGBƐNDƱƱ ŊGBƐYƐ KEDIƔZAƔ SƆSƆƆ TƆM SE.

Some of the IPA letters that were adopted into language orthographies have since become obsolete in the IPA itself.

Chart

Others letters are the graphic equivalent of IPA capitals, but are not identified with the IPA. Examples are ɟ Ɉ (the capital of ɉ), ʎ  (⅄) (the capital of λ in Americanist usage; similarly ƛ ), ɹ ꓤ/Ꮧ.

References 

International Phonetic Alphabet